King Conan is a collection of five fantasy short stories  by American writer Robert E. Howard featuring his  sword and sorcery hero Conan the Barbarian. It is also the name of two separate comic book series featuring the character.

The book was first published in hardcover by Gnome Press in 1953. The stories originally appeared in the 1930s in the fantasy magazine Weird Tales. The collection never saw publication in paperback; instead, its component stories were divided and distributed among other "Conan" collections.

Chronologically, the five short stories collected as King Conan are the fourth in Gnome's Conan series; the novel Conan the Conqueror follows.

Contents
"Introduction" (L. Sprague de Camp)
July 1, 1931 note from H. P. Lovecraft to Robert E. Howard
"Jewels of Gwahlur"
"Beyond the Black River"
"The Treasure of Tranicos" (edited/rewritten by de Camp from Howard's "The Black Stranger")
"The Phoenix on the Sword"
"The Scarlet Citadel"

Comics

Marvel Comics
Marvel Comics published 55 issues of a King Conan series from 1980-1989 (retitled Conan the King from #20-onward).

Dark Horse Comics
In 2011, Dark Horse Comics started a new Conan comic book, named King Conan; the Cimmerian, now old and alone on his throne of Aquilonia, recalls his previous years adventures with the young royal scribe; his tales are set after he got the throne. Dark Horse adapted several Howard's short stories plus The Hour of the Dragon. Until now, the list includes, in the following order:
"The Scarlet Citadel" (2011)
"The Phoenix on the Sword" (2012)
"The Hour of the Dragon" (2013)
"The Conqueror" (2014) (Originally, Dark Horse wanted to make 12 issues of The Hour of the Dragon, then they decided to split the story into two, publishing the second part with the alternate name of the novel.)

Reception
P. Schuyler Miller received the collection favorably, praising Howard's ability "to make the preposterous doings of his superhuman hero so real."

Everett F. Bleiler found that the original text of "The Black Stranger" "is much superior to the adaptation" provided here. He characterized the collection overall as "a weak selection", although singling out two scenes as effective.

References

1953 short story collections
Conan the Barbarian books by Robert E. Howard
Gnome Press books